Aap Uspenski (born 17 July 1966) is an Estonian wrestler and strongman.

He was born in Abja-Paluoja, in 1966.

He began his wrestling career in 1974, coached by his father. He won medals at World Sumo Championships. He is multiple-times Estonian champion in wrestling and sumo. 1990–1990 he won Estonian strongmen competition.

References

Living people
1966 births
Estonian male sport wrestlers
Estonian sumo wrestlers
People from Abja-Paluoja